Gaël Monfils was the defending champion.

Seeds

Draw

Final four

Top half

Bottom half

External links
 Main Draw
 Qualifying Draw

2009,Singles
Marrakech,Singles